The Fort Lauderdale–Tampa Bay rivalry, also known as the Florida Derby, refers to the suspended soccer rivalry that most recently involved the Fort Lauderdale Strikers and the Tampa Bay Rowdies, both of whom played in the North American Soccer League through the 2016 season. Over the years the rivalry has spanned more than one hundred matches across eight soccer leagues and several tournaments, and involved nine different teams from the two regions of Florida. At times it has involved players, coaches, management and fans. Even the press has fanned the rivalry's flames at times. From 2010 through 2014, the winner of the regular season series automatically won the Coastal Cup as well. The status of the rivalry beyond 2016 remains unclear because the Rowdies have since joined the United Soccer League, while the Strikers ongoing ownership and legal battles of 2016 and 2017 have left them defunct.

Statistics
As of August 13, 2017

History

Early history (Miami vs. Tampa Bay) 
The Florida Derby can trace its roots to June 6, 1975, when the upstart Tampa Bay Rowdies first played the Miami Toros in the original North American Soccer League. The Toros had finished the previous season as league runners-up, while the Rowdies were just an expansion team. The makings of a rivalry were there from the start, as the two squads came into the match tied for the best record in the league. Four minutes into that first-ever meeting, an on-field brawl erupted and two players were sent off. The accusations of foul play by both clubs continued throughout the season every time they played. This all came to head when they wound up meeting in the semi-finals of the NASL playoffs. The Rowdies coolly dispatched the Toros 3–0, en route to the Soccer Bowl '75 title. The two squads played six times over those first two years, including the one playoff match. The Toros' fortunes waned in 1976 and the franchise eventually moved to Fort Lauderdale to become the Strikers. It was then that the rivalry really began to take shape.

Original NASL 
The Rowdies and the original Fort Lauderdale Strikers first met in an indoor friendly on February 27, 1977 after the Miami Toros had moved to Fort Lauderdale and changed their name. It was around the time of their first outdoor meeting on May 7, 1977, that the term "Florida Derby" first appeared in local media reports. As NASL franchises they faced each other over 40 times, including 20 regular season games, 2 playoff games, 1 playoff mini-game, 5 friendlies, 12 times indoors and several reserve squad matches. During the 1983 NASL Grand Prix of Indoor Soccer, they also met in the finals of a $5,000 shoot-out challenge (which Tampa Bay won). The intrastate rivalry appeared to have run its course following the 1983 outdoor season, when the Strikers moved to Minnesota for the 1984 NASL season.

Interleague match 
To fill the Strikers' void, a new team in a new league began play at Lockhart Stadium in 1984. The team was the Fort Lauderdale Sun and the league was the United Soccer League. The Sun were owned by former Striker, Ronnie Sharp, and the roster featured 14 NASL veterans, eight of whom were ex-Strikers, including Teófilo Cubillas, Curtis Leeper, Colin Fowles, and player–coach Keith Weller. With so many NASL connections, it was not surprising that the Rowdies and Sun met for a friendly on June 27, with more matches planned for the future. Once again the rivalries flames were stoked by Rowdies' coach, Rodney Marsh. In his post-match comments, while praising the Sun squad he added that the Fort Lauderdale fans were "still ignorant." The NASL even considered merging with the USL for the 1985 season before finally folding. Alas, the beleaguered new league also ceased operations in 1985, only six match days into its second season.

Post-NASL years 
Four years later, the same Rowdies franchise and a new incarnation of the Strikers, were playing one another in the D2, American Soccer League. After two years both teams joined the newly formed American Professional Soccer League. During this era the two clubs would meet up twenty-one times, including the 1992 Professional Cup semi-finals. In 1992 the two clubs also staged an NASL reunion match to benefit a local charity. This era of the derby continued through the 1993 season, after which the original Rowdies folded. The Strikers of that time lasted only one more year themselves, before closing up shop as well.

MLS era 
The rivalry's fourth phase came to be in 1998 when the newly formed Miami Fusion joined the Tampa Bay Mutiny in Major League Soccer. Although their name implied they were based in Miami, the Fusion's home games were played in Ft. Lauderdale at Lockhart Stadium. Several of the derby's players from previous eras, such as Ray Hudson, Thomas Rongen, Perry Van der Beck, Eddie Austin, Farrukh Quarishi, Ivan McKinley and Nick Sakiewicz, ultimately found themselves employed by these MLS clubs. Hudson, who provided the Fusion's broadcast color commentary and later coached them, was one of the most vocal advocates of the rivalry's continuance during this era. Even the "Florida Derby" moniker was resurrected, despite neither team being directly linked to their footballing forebears. These two sides met only seventeen times, as both squads were contracted before the 2002 MLS season, thus putting the regional battle on ice once again.

The rivalry between current Florida MLS sides Inter Miami CF and Orlando City SC has also unofficially been called the "Florida Derby", among other names.

New NASL and beyond

In 2010 the rivalry rose from the ashes yet again into its most recent form, as FC Tampa Bay (licensing issues kept them from using the Rowdies name and logo until December 2011) and Miami FC (playing out of Fort Lauderdale) joined the North American Soccer League conference of the USSF Division 2 Professional League. One year later the new NASL became the USSF's sole sanctioned D2 League and Miami FC re-branded themselves as the Fort Lauderdale Strikers. In doing so they became the fourth club to bear that historic name. As of the 2016 NASL season the current versions of the Rowdies and Strikers have played twenty-eight times, including two friendlies and once in the second round of the U.S. Open Cup. In 2010 the term "Florida Derby" again resurfaced in the media as a reference to the regional rivalry. From 2010 until 2014 the winner of the season series also automatically laid claim to the Coastal Cup. The Rowdies won the first four, and the Strikers captured their first Coastal Cup in 2014. In 2015 and 2016 however, the Coastal Cup expanded to include two Florida-based NASL expansion teams, Jacksonville Armada FC and the new Miami FC.

The Rowdies departed from the NASL in October 2016, and began play in the United Soccer League in 2017. That coupled with the filing of a lawsuit by Tampa Bay owner, Bill Edwards, in November 2016 to gain control of the Strikers because of unpaid debts, cast a huge shadow over the short-term future of the rivalry. Fort Lauderdale opted not to field a team in 2017, although the franchise still existed on paper.

In 2020, The Miami FC joined the Rowdies in the United Soccer League, creating an alternative version of the rivalry.[Link]

Lawsuit of 2016–17

The rivalry began a bizarre chapter in November 2016 when Tampa Bay owner, Bill Edwards, filed a complaint in Pinellas County, Florida against the Strikers' holding company, Miami FC, LLC, over money loaned to the struggling club. In his suit Edwards claimed that they had failed to pay him back $300,000 in loans. Edwards is seeking damages and foreclosure on Fort Lauderdale's assets in the lawsuit. A signed promissory note details that the collateral the team put up to secure the loans included the team's patents, copyrights, trademarks, rights to use of the name "Fort Lauderdale Strikers" along with other tangible assets. Although the league was also named in the suit, he is only seeking a judgement from the Strikers.

The suit alleged that Edwards entered into a loan agreement with Strikers' ownership in July 2016, by transferring $450,000 to his team's cross-state rivals via his own company, Marketing Solutions Publications. A few weeks later his company made an additional loan of $120,000. Court records for the case imply that shortly after that, both parties agreed to an amendment to the original deal in which the Strikers were released from the initial $450,000 loan and Edwards agreed to loan them another $120,000. The new amendment specified that Fort Lauderdale's total debt would not surpass the $240,000 already owed, but according to Edwards’ complaint, he agreed to wire another $80,000 to the Strikers on September 2 because the team lacked sufficient funds to host a match against the New York Cosmos the next day.

In May 2017 Edwards was awarded a summary judgement in the case, and after a June 20 public sale, he gained full control of the copyrights, trademarks and any rights to the use of the name "Fort Lauderdale Strikers" or any variation for $5,100. Edwards has not yet announced what he plans to do with the Strikers brand going forward.

Records 

As of October 2016, Lockhart Stadium in Fort Lauderdale has hosted the most matches with 44. In a distant second place, Tampa Stadium served as the venue of record on 26 occasions, followed by the Rowdies' current home of Al Lang Stadium, with 13 games. The largest crowd to ever attend this derby was 41,102 and occurred on June 23, 1979, at Tampa Stadium. On June 8, 1980, a crowd of 18,223 fans packed into Lockhart Stadium, representing the largest crowd in a South Florida edition of the derby. Both of those matches saw the visitors win, 2–1, in overtime. The lowest attended official games in the derby's history were both cup matches. The 1992 Professional Cup semifinal drew in only 356 fans to a rain-soaked Tampa Stadium on September 4, 1992, while their second round tie in the U.S. Open Cup, also in the rain, brought out a feeble 972 to Lockhart on June 22, 2012. All-time to date, 22 matches in this derby have reached the end regulation time with the teams level on goals, but only 6 ended in a draw. The other 16 games used Extra Time, Golden Goal, Penalty Kick shoot-outs or NASL style shoot-outs to determine a winner. Among these tied matches, the Fort Lauderdale-based clubs hold a sizable edge of 10 wins, 5 draws, and 6 losses. The Miami Fusion had won a 1998 preseason friendly in a shootout, but MLS officials later declared the match a draw because the Fusion inadvertently used two players in the shootout who had already been substituted out during kept time.

Although other Florida teams, including the Jacksonville Teamen, Orlando Lions and Miami Sharks/Freedom among others, have played against several of these clubs from Tampa Bay and Fort Lauderdale, for whatever reason none has ever been able to match their intensity level on a regular basis.

Supporters 
Back in the rivalry's early days, the cheers were led by the "Fannies" in Tampa Bay, while "Striker Likers" filled the stands in Fort Lauderdale. Each side regularly made claims about the rudeness of the other's fans, such as being jeered at, pelted with rocks, spit on, doused with sodas or even chased down and attacked whenever visiting one another's domain. The rivalry between these supporters has earned points for truly creative ugliness of a kind not normally seen in American soccer. At one point, things quite literally got downright rank: During a match in Tampa in 1981, a couple of rotting fish, decked out (presumably by Rowdies fans) in the Strikers' red, yellow and black, were tossed up on the Ft. Lauderdale goal netting for all to smell.

Today the heart of the rivalry between the two sides exists primarily with the two clubs' supporter groups. Most recently, the Fort Lauderdale Strikers have been supported by the groups Miami Ultras and Flight 19. The Rowdies are supported by Ralph's Mob, an independent supporters association that alludes to "Ralph Rowdie"—the mascot in the original Rowdies logo.

Past results

NASL (1975–1976): Rowdies vs. Miami Toros

NASL (1977–1983): Rowdies vs. Strikers

NASL Indoor (1977–1983): Rowdies vs. Strikers 
It is readily acknowledged that indoor soccer is a different sport than association football. These matches are included as part of the all-time rivalry due to the fact that they were sanctioned by the NASL and contested by players under contract for the two NASL franchises at the time.

NASL/USL (1984): Rowdies vs. Sun

ASL/APSL (1988–1993): Rowdies vs. Strikers

MLS (1998–2001): Mutiny vs. Fusion 

*March 5, 1998, match was declared a draw because Fusion used two ineligible players in shootout-tiebreaker.

USSF D2 Pro/NASL (2010–2016): FC Tampa Bay/Rowdies vs. Miami FC/Strikers

Florida Derby totals

All teams, all competitions

Official matches 

*1978 playoff mini-game victory by Tampa Bay excluded from "official" totals because it was not a 90-minute match.

See also
Buccaneers–Dolphins rivalry
Lightning–Panthers rivalry
Heat-Magic rivalry
Citrus Series

References

External links 

Soccer rivalries in the United States
American Professional Soccer League
American Soccer League (1988–89)
Soccer clubs in Florida
Fort Lauderdale Strikers rivalries
Miami Fusion
North American Soccer League
North American Soccer League (1968–1984)
Tampa Bay Mutiny
Tampa Bay Rowdies
Soccer in Florida
Sports in Fort Lauderdale, Florida
Sports in Miami
Sports in St. Petersburg, Florida
Sports in Tampa, Florida
1977 establishments in Florida
Sports rivalries in Florida